General Nye may refer to:

Archibald Nye (1895–1967), British Army lieutenant general
Francis W. Nye (1918–2019), U.S. Air Force major general
James W. Nye (1815–1876), New York Militia major general